In the Grip of Winter is the second book of The Animals of Farthing Wood series by Colin Dann.  It was first published in 1981, and later republished as part one of the first "Omnibus".

Plot summary

As winter approaches Toad, Adder, and the hedgehogs go into hibernation, while the rest of the animals prepare for winter. However the winter is harsh and kills most of the field mice and voles, while making it difficult for the rest of the other animals to find food. Whistler and his mate help Fox, Vixen, Weasel, and Badger by bringing them fish; while the Great White Stag brings hay for the rabbits, hares, field mice, and voles.

Badger decides to go seek out other animals in White Deer Park to see if they know how to cope with the cold. On the way Badger meets a hungry stoat eating a rabbit who tells Badger that this winter is likely to half the population of White Deer Park. Badger then decides to meet with the Great White Stag but falls and injures his leg. The Warden finds him and cares for him while he is injured. While in the Warden's cottage Badger convinces the Warden's cat Ginger to send a message to his friends so that they know he is not in any danger. Ginger finds Mole and relays Badger's message, but Kestrel thinks Ginger is trying to attack Mole and attacks Ginger with his talons. Though Fox and Vixen care for the injured Ginger he leaves while Fox and Vixen are out hunting so he can get home sooner.

When Badger is well he leaves the Warden and tries to convince the rest of his friend that the best way to survive is to live with the Warden. When they reject this idea Badger returns to the Warden alone. When the Warden refuses to let Badger back into the cottage Ginger explains that the Warden only looked after Badger while he was injured and now that Badger is well the Warder expects Badger to live in his natural environment. Badger then returns to his friends feeling very foolish. On the way back Badger meets Kestrel and saves him from Ginger who wants revenge for Kestrel's earlier attack on him. Once Badger returns the animals then decide to search for food by human houses.

While out foraging they witness two foxes steal two chickens. However the owner of the chickens chase and shoot both foxes, along with the injured chickens. They then put the dead chickens in a shed. Fox then steals the chickens from the shed but wakes the dog while doing this. The humans check only the chicken coop for foxes and assume that because it is undamaged the fox was scared off. While returning to the park Fox comes across the two dead foxes and realises that he has the chickens only because the two other foxes died.

By having Tawny Owl, Kestrel, and Whistler bring waste food from the houses to the park the animals are no longer at risk from starving to death. One night while eating this food they hear the cry of a hare and find that the stoat Badger met earlier has killed one of Hare's leverets. Though unhappy about this they accept that this is the law of nature and do not punish Stoat.

During the winter the Warden becomes ill so both he and his cat leave the park. However, in his absence two poachers with shotguns enter the park and start hunting the white deer. Fox is able to defeat the poachers by 'chasing' the deer near a frozen pond, when the poachers run onto this pond the ice breaks and they lose their shotguns while trying to climb out. However the poachers return with pistols and start shooting every fox they see. This time the deer save the foxes by charging en masse at the poachers.

When the Warden returns to his cottage the animals assume that the poachers will not return, but the poachers are unaware the Warden is back and decide to hunt foxes in areas where the deer are not present. Fox then lures the poachers to the Warden's cottage while Tawny Owl tells the Great White Stag about the poachers. The deer then prevents the poachers escaping while the Warden and his guest the Vet detain them.

Spring arrives causing Toad, Adder, and the hedgehogs to come out of hibernation. Due to his mating instincts Toad tries to return to Farthing Wood pond but he and another toad are captured, and put in a jar by some boys. Though Whistler is able to break one jar and free the toad inside Toad is still trapped inside another jar. Vixen recommend that Whistler takes the jar to the Warden, who opens it and frees Toad. Kestrel learns that the toad that Whistler freed is a female called Paddock who is returning to White Deer Park to breed. She is introduced to Toad and the two of them go off to mate. Fox wonders if Vixen would have been impressed if he had been so direct with her.

At the end, the surviving animals of Farthing Wood all gather together and celebrate still being alive.

See also

1981 British novels
1981 fantasy novels
Animals of Farthing Wood books
Children's fantasy novels
British fantasy novels
Hutchinson (publisher) books
1981 children's books